Sergobo  is a village in Vakaga Prefecture, Central African Republic and inhabited by Gula.

History 
During Central African Republic Bush War, FACA torched 34 houses and killed five civilians. Sergobo became a ghost town in February 2007. In early August 2009, Kara militia attacked Sergobo.

Facilities 
Sergobo has one public health post and one school.

References 

Populated places in Vakaga